Macintosh Repair & Upgrade Secrets is a hardback book for repairing and upgrading Apple Macintosh personal computers from the Macintosh 128K to Macintosh SE models. The book was written by Larry Pina and is out of print.

See also 
 Larry Pina

Computer books
Macintosh internals
Books by Larry Pina